"Golden Touch" is a song by English indie rock band Razorlight, appearing as the eighth track on their 2004 debut album, Up All Night. The song is based on MTV2 and Queens of Noize DJ Mairead Nash, with whom Johnny Borrell had a brief relationship. "Golden Touch" was released as the fourth single from Up All Night in June 2004 and peaked at  9 on the UK Singles Chart. In 2006, it was ranked 87th on Q magazine's "100 Greatest Songs Ever".

Track listings
UK CD single
 "Golden Touch" (full length)
 "Golden Touch" (Jo Whiley session)

UK limited-edition CD single
 "Golden Touch" (full length)
 "Bright Lights" (demon version)

UK limited-edition 7-inch single
A. "Golden Touch"
B. "Dean, Take Your Time"

Charts

Certifications

Release history

References

2004 singles
2004 songs
Razorlight songs
Songs written by Johnny Borrell
Vertigo Records singles